Giovanni Ducco (died 1496) was a Roman Catholic prelate who served as Bishop of Coron (1479–1496).

Biography
On 7 June 1479, Giovanni Ducco was appointed during the papacy of Pope Sixtus IV as Bishop of Coron. On 5 September 1479, he was consecrated bishop by Šimun Vosić, Titular Archbishop of Patrae, with Ardicino della Porta, Bishop of Aleria, and Giorgio della Rovere, Bishop of Orvieto, serving as co-consecrators He served as Bishop of Coron until his death on 21 January 1496.

References 

15th-century Roman Catholic bishops in the Republic of Venice
Bishops appointed by Pope Sixtus IV
1496 deaths